Rowdy Inspector is a 2022 Bhojpuri-Language action Thriller film produced by Mahankali Diwakar and Directed by Shankar. This film stars Khesari Lal Yadav, Meghasri and Raksha Gupta.

Plot

Inspector Suraj, devastated from the murder of his wife and daughter has become a drunkard, got a case related to serial killings in the city.

Cast

 Khesari Lal Yadav, as inspector Suraj
 Meghasri, Suraj's wife
 Raksha Gupta, A news reporter
 Sai Kiran,as Santosh (Serial Killer)

Production

Development 
Khesari shared pictures and video with Telugu actor Kaushal Manda in 2021, notifying that he is going to work with south Indian director Shankar in his next Bhojpuri movie.

Filming 
Most of the filming was done in Hyderabad, Khesari shared several stills from the set on his Instagram handle.

Marketing 
Trailer of the film released on 6 March 2022 on YouTube.

Music
Om Jha and Arya Sharma has produced the music for this film.

Release
The film released on 5 August 2022 across India.

Reception
The film got positive response from the audience, Anand Mandir Cinema hall of Varanasi, post on its Facebook account that this film performed better than Raksha Bandhan and Laal Singh Chaddha in that cinema hall.

References

2022 films
2020s Bhojpuri-language films